Ruinen is a village in the Dutch province of Drenthe. It is located in the municipality of De Wolden, about 10 km northwest of Hoogeveen. The Dwingelderveld National Park is located near Ruinen.

History 
The village was first mentioned in 1139 as de Runa. The etymology is unknown. Ruinen is an esdorp from the Early Middle Ages. Around 1140, a double monastery of the Benedictines was founded in Ruinen, however they moved to De Wijk in 1325.

The Dutch Reformed has been built in the 15th century replacing and reusing the monastery church of which dated from around 1140. The tower was built in 1423. The spire has been renewed in 1660 after it had been damaged by a storm, and the crown was replaced in 1952. Between 1972 and 1975, the church was restored to its original form before 1836.

Ruinen was home to 1,059 people in 1840. Ruinen was a separate municipality until 1998, when it became part of De Wolden. The windmill De Zaandplatte was rebuilt in 1964, and is open to the public.

Notable residents 
 Jan Hendrik de Boer (1899–1971), a physicist and chemist.
 Sione Jongstra (born 1976), a Dutch triathlete

Gallery

References

Municipalities of the Netherlands disestablished in 1998
Populated places in Drenthe
Former municipalities of Drenthe
De Wolden